Kominé is a village and seat of the commune of Farakou Massa in the Cercle of Ségou in the Ségou Region of southern-central Mali. It lies on the Niger River 50 km northeast of Ségou.

References

Populated places in Ségou Region